Stanley Super 800 are an Irish band, from Cork. The group's second album, Louder & Clearer, received a nomination for the 2007 Choice Music Prize.

Discography

EPs
 Moonlight (2003)

Studio albums
 Stanley Super 800 (2004)
 Louder & Clearer (2007)

References

External links
 Stanley Super 800 Myspace

Irish indie rock groups
Irish electronic musicians
Musical groups from Cork (city)